The Britannia Challenge Cup is a rowing event for men's coxed fours at the annual Henley Royal Regatta on the River Thames at Henley-on-Thames in England.  It is open to male crews from a single rowing club.

Since 2004, Boat clubs from any university, college, or secondary school are not permitted, with a separate event (now the Prince Albert Challenge Cup) for student crews.

The Britannia Challenge Cup was first awarded in 1969, as an event for club and student men's coxed fours, and is named after the Nottingham Britannia Rowing Club, to mark the club's centenary.

Winners

As Henley Prize

As Britannia Challenge Cup

References

Events at Henley Royal Regatta
Rowing trophies and awards